The Art(e) of Romance is the fifth studio album of Argentine melodic hardcore band Fun People, issued by Ugly Records in April 1999.

Track listing
"Take Over"
"Middle of the Round"
"F.M.S."
"What Will We Gonna Pay?"
"Leave Me Alone"
"Dick Dale"
"Si Pudieras (Desde Ushuaia)"
"Water"
"One Day, Like Wilckens"
"Vivar"
"Vientos"
"Question"
"Diciembre"
"Donde Estás?"
"Never Knows (Es Obvio)"
"Blah, Blah, Blah"
"Sardina" (Instrumental)
"A Mi Manera"
"El Stranger"

Personnel
Recorded and mixed in Chicago, USA by Steve Albini on Estudio Electrical. 
Mastered by J. Golden Studios Hollywood CA.
Mr. Chuly Pogiese - bass
Lord Nano and William - Caños.
Gori - guitars
Gato - Drums
Ron Spiritual guide and Miss Muerte singer and coordination.

1999 albums
Fun People albums
albums produced by Steve Albini